Mount McClung is a mountain  southeast of Mount González in the Sarnoff Mountains, Ford Ranges, Marie Byrd Land, Antarctica. It was discovered and mapped by the United States Antarctic Service (1939–41), and was named by the Advisory Committee on Antarctic Names after Lieutenant Herbert C. McClung, U.S. Navy, officer in charge at Byrd Station in 1965.

References

Mountains of Marie Byrd Land